Justice Corrigan may refer to:

Carol Corrigan, associate justice of the Supreme Court of California
J. J. P. Corrigan, associate justice of the Ohio Supreme Court
Maura D. Corrigan, associate justice and chief justice of the Michigan Supreme Court